Jegun (Jégun) is a commune in the Gers department in southwestern France.

Geography

History
The village was founded in the 11th century and fortified around 1180 by Bernard IV, count of Armagnac. It is a bastide, the original layout is still preserved today.
In 1577, Henri de Navarre, also known as Henry IV, hid in one of the streets ("La Grande Rue", the central street of the village) to escape enemy troops commanded by Villars, the Governor of Guyenna.

Population

See also
Communes of the Gers department

References

External links

Official website
Tourist office site
Castéra-Verduzan

Communes of Gers